Adam Marian Kleczkowski (born 25 March 1883 in Kraków, died 17 November 1949 in Kraków) was a Polish philologist and Professor of Linguistics at the Jagiellonian University. He was a member of the Polish Academy of Learning. He was a specialist in German linguistics.

Works
Dialekty niemieckie na ziemiach polskich (1915)
Neuentdeckte Altsaechsische Psalmenfragmente aus der Karolingerzeit (1923-1926, 2 vols.)
Wyrazy niemieckie w staroczeskim i staropolskim (1927-1928)
Polski język żeglarski (1928)
Ein neues Fragment von Willirams Paraphase des Hoches Liedes (1930)
Wpływ języka polskiego na dialekty prusko-niemieckie (1931)
Niemiecko-polskie stosunki językowe i literackie (1935)
Trudności w etymologiach słowiańsko-niemieckich języka Wenedów Lueneburskich (1946)
Germanistyka, anglistyka i skandynawistyka w Polsce (1948)
Słowiańskie wpływy językowe w Szlezwigu i Holsztynie (1948)
Stary marsz berneński (1949)
Dialekt Wilamowic w zachodniej Galicji. Fonetyka i fleksja.
Dialekt Wilamowic w zachodniej Galicji. Składnia (szyk wyrazów)

References

Linguists from Poland
1883 births
1949 deaths
Academic staff of Jagiellonian University
Members of the Polish Academy of Learning
Academic staff of Adam Mickiewicz University in Poznań
Germanists
20th-century linguists